The Vancouver Harbour Board was created by Canada's Federal Parliament in 1914.
The Board was responsible for a recommendation that the Federal government should dredge the First Narrows of Vancouver's Burrard Inlet, allowing larger ocean-going vessels to moor in Vancouver's inner harbour.

The Harbour Board operated harbour support vessels, like steam-powered fireboat Orion.

References

Former Canadian federal departments and agencies
Transport in Greater Vancouver